Crazy? Yes! Dumb? No! is the second full-length album released by The Mint Chicks and was originally released in New Zealand on the Flying Nun label. The album was produced by singer Kody, guitarist Ruban Nielson, and their father Chris Nielson. Despite its humble beginnings (the album was recorded between Kody Nielson's garage and his father's bedroom) the album dominated the Vodafone New Zealand Music Awards 2007, earning five awards as well as achieving Gold status in the Chicks' home country of New Zealand. The album was also released in the US through Milan Records on September 9, 2008.

In the December 2009 issue of Real Groove magazine, Crazy? Yes! Dumb? No! was named the New Zealand album of the decade and the title track the New Zealand single of the decade.

Track listing
All songs composed by Kody Nielson and Ruban Nielson Except  "If My Arm Was A Mic Stand, Would You Hold My Hand?" written by Michael Logie and Kody Nielson.

 "Ockham's Razor" – 4:26
 "This Is Your Last Chance to Be Famous, My Love" – 4:02
 "Welcome to Nowhere" – 2:56
 "You're Just as Confused as I Am" – 2:42
 "Walking Off a Cliff Again" – 2:11
 "Don't Turn Me on Just to Turn on Me" – 1:56
 "Funeral Day" – 3:36
 "Real Friends" – 2:23
 "She's Back on Crack" – 1:48
 "Crazy? Yes! Dumb? No!" – 4:40
 "If My Arm Was a Mic Stand, Would You Hold My Hand?" – 2:37
 "Sleeping During the Day" – 3:25
 "Ammie" – 2:54
 "100 Minutes of Silence" – 6:14

Singles
 "Crazy? Yes! Dumb? No!" (April 2007)
 "Welcome to Nowhere" (June 2007)
 "Sleeping During the Day" (July 2007)
 "Walking Off a Cliff Again" (October 2007)
 "If My Arm Was a Mic Stand, Would You Hold My Hand?" (January 2008)
 "She's Back on Crack" (March 2008)

Awards for Crazy? Yes! Dumb? No!

References

2006 albums
The Mint Chicks albums
Flying Nun Records albums